The 29 March 2007 Baghdad bombings was a 29 March 2007, double suicide attack on the al-Shaab market in a Shiite district of northeastern Baghdad.

The two bombers, wearing explosive vests, walked into the Al-Shaab market as it was packed with shoppers and blew themselves up. The death toll eventually climbed to 82 killed and 138 people were also wounded.

See also
 2007 suicide bombings in Iraq

References

2007 murders in Iraq
Marketplace attacks in Iraq
Suicide bombings in Baghdad
Mass murder in 2007
Terrorist incidents in Iraq in 2007
Terrorist incidents in Baghdad
2000s in Baghdad
Violence against Shia Muslims in Iraq
March 2007 events in Iraq